Jérôme Potier (born 18 July 1962) is a French former tennis player. He is currently Josselin Ouanna's coach and has coached Marc Gicquel and Thierry Ascione.

Career finals

Singles (2 runner-ups)

Doubles (1 runner-up)

External links
 
 

1962 births
Living people
French male tennis players
French tennis coaches
Sportspeople from Rennes